Garrouli; Hindi Name गर्रौली) is a fort and former princely state in present Madhya Pradesh, central India.

History

Garrauli became a princely state in 1812, when a sanad (feudal deed) from the British Government was granted to its first Diwan Bahadur, Gopal Singh, second son of Thakur Bhagwant Singh of Mahewa.

The state maintained a military force of 2 cavalry, 56 infantry and 4 guns. The founder and his succeeding descendants bore the style Diwan Sahib or Diwan Bahadur.

Garrauli was a non-salute state, in the charge of the colonial Bundelkhand Agency. It had a population of 5,231 in 1901, a revenue of 25,000 Rupees and surface of 101 km2.
It ceased to exist de facto when the states were seized in 1947, and formally on 3 March 1948 by accession to India. The privy purse was fixed at 34,000 Rupees.

Rulers
 Gopal Singh, 1st Diwan Sahib of Garrauli 1812 - death 1830.
 Parichhat Singh, son of the above, 2nd Diwan Sahib of Garrauli 1831, created Diwan Bahadur 17.10.1844, died 1884
 Chandrabhan Singh, born 2 April 1883, son of the son of the above, 3rd Diwan Sahib of Garrauli 19 October 1884; Honorable Captain of Chhatrasal Infantry (Panna) 1925; died 20 November 1946
 Raghuraj Singh, son of the above, born 16 January 1910, 4th Diwan Sahib of Garrauli 1946
 Raja RAVINDRA SINGH, 5th Diwan Sahib of Garrauli since 17th September 1964, born 19th February 1957.

External links
 Indian Princely States on www.uq.net.au, as archived on web.archive.org, with genealogy
 

Princely states of Madhya Pradesh
Rajput princely states